Western Beaver Junior/Senior High School is a public high school in Industry, Pennsylvania, United States.  It is the only high school in the Western Beaver County School District. Athletic teams compete as the Western Beaver Golden Beavers in the Western Pennsylvania Interscholastic Athletic League.

Notes and references

External links
 District Website

Public high schools in Pennsylvania
Schools in Beaver County, Pennsylvania
Education in Pittsburgh area